Zixiao  is a town-level administrative unit under the jurisdiction of Nanfeng County, Fuzhou City, Jiangxi Province, People's Republic of China.  As of 2017, it has 19 villages under its administration.

Administrative Divisions 
Zixiao has jurisdiction over the following areas:

Shanggu Village, Dongcun, Raojia Village, Qia Village, Xidong Village, Dalingbei Village, Mingyang Village, Huanglongkeng Village, Xintian Village, Yucun Village, Zhoufang Village, Huangsha Village, Xikeng Village, Gem Village, Luofang Village, Hexi Village, Zhufang Village, Xixi Village and Qiangtang Village.

References 

Nanfeng County